Kyzyl-Yelga (Qıźılyılğa) is a rural locality (a village) in Arslanovsky Selsoviet, Buzdyaksky District, Bashkortostan, Russia. The population was 27 as of 2010. There is 1 street.

Geography 
Kyzyl-Yelga is located 29 km northwest of Buzdyak (the district's administrative centre) by road. Urzaybash is the nearest rural locality.

References 

Rural localities in Buzdyaksky District